The second inauguration of Richard Nixon as president of the United States was held on Saturday, January 20, 1973, at the East Portico of the United States Capitol in Washington, D.C. This was the 47th inauguration and marked the commencement of the second and final term of both Richard Nixon as president and Spiro Agnew as vice president. Both Agnew and Nixon resigned within two years of this term. In December 1973, Gerald Ford replaced Agnew as vice president and in the following year, replaced Nixon as president. This made Nixon the first and, as of 2023, only person to be inaugurated four times as both president and vice president. Chief Justice Warren E. Burger administered both the presidential and vice presidential oaths of office. During the ceremony, Look With Pride On Our Flag, a song dedicated to President Nixon and composed by Hank Fort, was played.

Inaugural festivities
The inaugural theme was "The Spirit of '76". The 1973 Inaugural Committee's chairman was J. Willard Marriott. Other officers of the committee and its working groups included Jeb Magruder, Mark Evans, Ken Rietz, Ed Cowling, Ann Dore, Pam Powell. H. R. Haldeman was not officially part of the committee but was involved in many of the committee's important decisions.

Three simultaneous inaugural concerts were planned: a Symphonic Concert (a "show for financial contributors") held at Kennedy Center Concert Hall, a Youth Concert ("a show for young people", to feature the Osmonds and the Carpenters), and an American Music Concert ("a show for all others", to feature country, folk, jazz, Dixieland, etc).

The committee decided to program Eugene Ormandy, Nixon's favorite conductor (Nixon had awarded Ormandy the Presidential Medal of Freedom in 1970), and the Philadelphia Orchestra for the Symphonic Concert, breaking the tradition since the 1930s of hiring the National Symphony Orchestra for the inauguration. In early December 1972 the committee considered asking Dimitri Tiomkin for a new work to accompany a reading of Lincoln's 2nd inaugural address for the concert (possibly at the suggestion of Nixon's friend and supporter Tex Ritter, for whom Tiomkin's The Ballad of High Noon became a signature tune). But with fears that Tiomkin would work too slow, and at Ormandy's suggestion, Vincent Persichetti was approached to write the work. Persichetti completed the work in two weeks, it became his A Lincoln Address, opus 124. During the time that Persichetti was composing; the Vietnam War's Christmas Bombings began. The committee developed reservations about the appropriateness of Lincoln's address at the inauguration in the climate of war, and pulled Persichetti's composition from the program after it had been announced.

The Symphonic Concert's program consisted of:

 National Anthem
 Copland's Fanfare for the Common Man
 Beethoven's 5th symphony
 a choral medley of patriotic American music, including portions of the Declaration of Independence read by Charlton Heston, and ending with America the Beautiful, led by Robert Wagner and the Los Angeles Master Chorale
 Grieg's Piano Concerto played by Van Cliburn
 Tchaikovsky's 1812 overture.

Death and state funeral of Lyndon B. Johnson
Just four weeks after the death of former president Harry S. Truman, former president Lyndon B. Johnson, whom Nixon replaced in the White House in January 1969, died of a heart attack at the age of 64, two days after Nixon's second inauguration. Johnson thus became the sixth president who died during his immediate successor's administration, following George Washington (1799), James K. Polk (1849), Andrew Johnson (1875), Chester A. Arthur (1886) and Calvin Coolidge (1933), who died during the administrations of John Adams, Zachary Taylor, Ulysses S. Grant, Grover Cleveland (1st term), and Herbert Hoover, respectively. Many of the ceremonies that the Armed Forces Inauguration Committee had planned during the ten days had to be canceled to allow for a full state funeral.

Many of the military men who participated in the inauguration took part in the funeral. Johnson's casket traveled the entire length of the Capitol, entering through the Senate wing when taken into the rotunda to lie in state, and exiting through the House wing; this was due to construction on the East Front steps.

The final services took place on January 25 with the funeral taking place at National City Christian Church in Washington, D.C., where LBJ worshipped at often during his presidency, and ended with burial at his Texas ranch.

See also
Presidency of Richard Nixon
First inauguration of Richard Nixon
1972 United States presidential election

References

External links

 Video of Nixon's Second Inaugural Address from hulu.com (with audio)
 Text of Nixon's Second Inaugural Address
 Audio of Nixon's Second Inaugural Address

1973 in Washington, D.C.
Inauguration 2
United States presidential inaugurations
1973 in American politics
January 1973 events in the United States